Derek Sarno is co-founder of Wicked Healthy, a healthy plant-based food blog that he co-founded with his brother Chad Sarno, and Executive Chef and Director of Plant Based Innovation at Tesco. He is also co-founding a plant-based seafood company Good Catch Foods, and he was previously Senior Global Executive Chef of Recipe and Product Development at Whole Foods Market. He participated in the 2016 Seed Food and Wine Fest in Miami, including using mushrooms to "taste, and even feel, like your favorite meaty meals" according to Men's Journal.

In his role at Tesco, where vegetarian and vegan product sales increased 25% from 2016 to 2017, Sarno has helped develop their plant-based food options, such as by doubling the vegetarian and vegan entreés of their 2017 Christmas product line.

He argues that "the approach that will win" for plant-based food is increasing its availability and convenience, especially in the UK, which he believes lags behind the US. He also wants less emphasis on the "vegan" label, given vegans make up a small minority of the population, and instead he wants focus on "food that's good for everyone." He and his brother use their blog to advocate for an "80% healthy, 20% wicked" diet as an accessible, durable way to stay healthy.

Books 
  Sarno, Chad, Sarno, Derek; The Wicked Healthy Cookbook (Grand Central, 2018)

References 

American chefs
American male chefs
American veganism activists
Chefs of vegan cuisine
Living people
Plant-based diet advocates
Vegan cookbook writers
Year of birth missing (living people)